The Yorkshire Football League was the name of two football competitions. The first lasted three seasons in the late 19th century and the second lasted 62 years until merging with the Midland League in 1982 to become the Northern Counties East League.

Yorkshire League (1897–1900)

History
The original league was founded in 1897, and featured ten teams, however it only lasted for two seasons and was dissolved by the end of 1900. It is generally not viewed as the same competition as that which emerged in the 1920s.

During the three years of its existence, the original Yorkshire league was won first by Sheffield United reserves and then in 1898–99 Wombwell were champions. The competition took place before many of the more well known clubs of today were formed, for example it featured a team from Leeds, which predated both Leeds City and Leeds United. The same could be said for the Huddersfield, Halifax, and Bradford sides.

Honours

League winners

Yorkshire League (1920–1982)

History
The second Yorkshire League was formed in 1920, catering for a mixture of semi-professional and amateur local football teams. Some of the Football League clubs entered their reserve sides and third teams.

The first champions were Bradford Park Avenue reserves. They were the only reserve outfit in the league during that inaugural season, but their success in the Yorkshire League induced other bigger clubs to sign their reserves up for inclusion for the following seasons.

The league originally consisted of a single section of 13 clubs, and although numbers rose and fell, by 1935 had reached a stable membership of 20 clubs. However, the league ceased operations in 1939 on the outbreak of World War II. For the 1931–32 and 1932–33 seasons, the number of clubs competing was so small that two separate competitions were organised, with the winners of the first competition playing the winners of the second competition for the league championship.

No club dominated the league in particular before World War II, with Selby Town the only team who won successive titles in 1934–35 and 1935–36. Bradford Park Avenue reserves along with Selby Town remained the overall most successful however, with three titles each to their names. There were only six seasons where the title was not competed for, this was during part of the 1940s when, due to World War II, many of the players in football competitions all over the country were called up to fight and thus the leagues were put on hold.

After the War, the league resumed for the 1945–46 season, and within five years had enough clubs to form two divisions, entitled Division One and Division Two. This pattern continued until 1961, when a third division was formed (although that only lasted three seasons, and then lay dormant until revived for the 1970–71 season).

Stocksbridge Works became the dominant force in the Yorkshire League of the 1950s. They were founder members of Division Two and won that league in its second season, gaining promotion. In their début year in the top division they took the title. After a two-year hiatus, when Selby Town again completed a double, Stocksbridge won the Championship for four consecutive seasons, a record which stood until the league's demise. After their sustained period of success, Stocksbridge became a "yo-yo club," spending short periods in Divisions One and Two, and also dipped down to Division Three for a single season.

The league ran until 1981–82, when it merged with the Midland League to form the Northern Counties East League.

Honours

League winners

League Cup finals

Former member clubs

References

 
1920 establishments in England
Defunct football leagues in England
Football competitions in Yorkshire